Plaché příběhy is a 1982 Czechoslovak film. The film starred Josef Kemr.

References

External links
 

1982 films
Czechoslovak crime comedy films
1980s Czech-language films
Czech crime comedy films
1980s Czech films